Enis Fazlagić (born 27 March 2000) is a Macedonian professional footballer who plays as a midfielder for Slovak club DAC Dunajská Streda, on loan from Wisła Kraków, and the North Macedonia national team.

Club career

MŠK Žilina
Fazlagić made his Fortuna Liga debut for Žilina against Nitra on 28 July 2018. He appeared in the starting-XI of the home fixture and witnessed the entire duration of the 2-1 victory, won following goals by Michal Škvarka and future Slovak international Róbert Boženík, despite an equalizer by Andrej Fábry.

Fazlagić had to wait for his premier goal for over two years, reaching it in the last match of 2020 in a derby fixture at Tehelné pole against Slovan Bratislava. Fazlagić equalized the score of the game in the 85th minute following a cross by Branislav Sluka, setting a score at 2:2. Rafael Ratão however grabbed three points for then-table leaders Slovan in the stoppage time, finalizing the score at 3:2.

Wisła Kraków
On 21 January 2022, it was announced Fazlagić joined Polish Ekstraklasa club Wisła Kraków, signing a four-and-a-half-year deal.

Loan to DAC
On 18 August 2022, Fazlagić returned to Slovakia to join DAC Dunajská Streda on a one-year loan, with an option for the Slovak side to buy him out at the end of his spell.

References

External links
 MŠK Žilina official club profile 
 
 Futbalnet profile 
 

2000 births
Living people
Sportspeople from Veles, North Macedonia
Association football midfielders
Macedonian footballers
North Macedonia international footballers
North Macedonia youth international footballers
North Macedonia under-21 international footballers
KF Shkëndija players
MŠK Žilina players
Wisła Kraków players
FC DAC 1904 Dunajská Streda players
Macedonian First Football League players
Slovak Super Liga players
Ekstraklasa players
I liga players
Macedonian expatriate footballers
Expatriate footballers in Slovakia
Macedonian expatriate sportspeople in Slovakia
Expatriate footballers in Poland
Macedonian expatriate sportspeople in Poland
Albanians in North Macedonia